Rina Jimenez-David (born January 11, 1955) is notable as a Philippines journalist and columnist for the Philippine Daily Inquirer. She is an advocate for women's health issues. She was awarded Best Columnist for Excellence in Population Reporting  at the Global Media Awards in 2004 and the TOWNS award in 2013. She was a judge in a contest to select outstanding teachers. She met with Philippine president Noynoy Aquino and other journalists and politicians in 2012. She was the managing editor of a publication about her Jimenez family genealogy entitled In Search of Family published in 2001. She lived in Alaminos, Pangasinan, graduated from the University of Santo Tomas in 1976, and joined the broadsheet newspaper Philippine Daily Inquirer in 1988. She studied journalism at the Johns Hopkins University School of Public Health in Baltimore. Her book Women at Large was a finalist in the Philippine National Book Awards in 1994.

References

Filipino women
Filipino journalists
Living people
1955 births
Writers from Pangasinan
Filipino women writers
University of Santo Tomas alumni
Philippine Daily Inquirer people